The Return of the Druses is a tragedy in blank verse by Robert Browning. It was originally published as the fourth number (No. IV) of Bells and Pomegranates in 1843. The manuscript was first named Mansoor the Hierophant.

Persons 

 The Grand-Master's Prefect
 The Patriarch's Nuncio
 The Republic's Admiral
 Loys de Dreux, Knight-Novice
 Initiated Druses—Djabal, Khalil, Anael, Maani, Karshook, Raghib, Ayoob, and others
 Uninitiated Druses, Prefect's Guard, Nuncio's Attendants, Admiral's Force
Time, 14—

See also 

 Druze

References

Sources 

 Scudder, Horace E. (1895). The Complete Poetic and Dramatic Works of Robert Browning. Boston and New York: Houghton, Mifflin and Co.; Cambridge: The Riverside Press. p. 197.

Further reading 

 Fahmi, Ismael M.; Dabbagh, Lanja A. (18 June 2020). "The Misrepresentation of The Druse Community in Browning’s Unsuccessful Tragedy: "The Return of the Druses" (1843): An Analytical Study". Koya University Journal of Humanities and Social Sciences, 3(1). pp. 69–72. .
 Jaouad, Hédi A. (28 June 2018). "The Return of the Druses: Djabal, Betwixt and Between". In Browning Upon Arabia: A Moveable East. Palgrave Macmillan. pp 127–153. .

Plays by Robert Browning
1843 plays
Orientalism